Psinidia is a genus of band-winged grasshoppers in the family Acrididae. There are at least three described species in Psinidia.

Species
These three species belong to the genus Psinidia:
 Psinidia amplicornis Caudell, 1903 (Caudell's longhorn grasshopper)
 Psinidia amplicornus Caudell, 1903
 Psinidia fenestralis (Serville, 1839) (longhorn band-wing grasshopper)

References

Further reading

External links

 

Oedipodinae
Articles created by Qbugbot